Patawad is the studio album by Filipina singer Moira Dela Torre. It was released in 2020 by Star Music. The album consists of thirteen tracks. This album features the trilogy "Patawad, Paalam" with I Belong To The Zoo, "Paalam" with Ben&Ben, and the titular song "Patawad". The album was certified platinum the same year.

Background

Singles
The sixth single "Hanggang Sa Huli" was released for the Filipino action drama television series 24/7, starring Julia Montes. Dela Torre dedicated this song to the employees of ABS-CBN in the midst of the network's legislative franchise controversy.

Patawad, Paalam trilogy
The second single "Patawad, Paalam" was released on June 13, 2019, with a music video released on July 1, 2019. The music video started a love story, portrayed by JM de Guzman and Anna Luna, on growing old with a lingering regret of having ended their relationship.

The third single of the album "Paalam" was released on September 13, 2019, marking Dela Torre's first collaboration with Filipino folk-pop band Ben&Ben. The official music video was released on March 26, 2020 making up the second chapter on leaving a relationship without explanations.

The fifth single and titular song "Patawad" was released on February 6, 2020, with a music video, released the same day as "Paalam", on March 26, 2020. The music video, the final part to close the trilogy, makes up the final chapter on gaining freedom in forgiveness.

Track listing
8 songs were written by Dela Torre and husband Jason Hernandez with contributions from Erik Santos, Argee Guerrero of I Belong To The Zoo and Paolo Benjamin Guico of Ben&Ben.

Certification

References

See also
Malaya (Moira Dela Torre album)
Moira Dela Torre discography

2020 albums
Moira Dela Torre albums
Pop albums by Filipino artists
Soul albums by Filipino artists